John or Johnny Lawrence may refer to:

Politicians
John Lawrence (lord mayor) (died 1692), lord mayor of London
John Lawrence (New York politician) (1618–1699), mayor of New York City
John Lawrence (Pennsylvania politician) (born 1978), member of the Pennsylvania House of Representatives
John W. Lawrence (1800–1888), U.S. Representative from New York
John Lawrence, 2nd Baron Lawrence (1846–1913), British peer and Conservative politician
John L. Lawrence (1785–1849), American lawyer, diplomat and politician from New York

Others
John Lawrence (1609–1667), early settler of Watertown, Massachusetts in 1630, later Selectman of Groton, Massachusetts
John Lawrence, colonial Surveyor-General, drew the Lawrence Line (1743) dividing Provinces of East Jersey and West Jersey (New Jersey)
John Lawrence (illustrator) (born 1933), English illustrator and wood engraver
John Lawrence (martyr) (died 1555), English Protestant martyr
John Lawrence, Irish landowner, owner of Ballymore Castle
John Lawrence (musician) a.k.a. Infinity Chimps, Welsh musician
John Lawrence  (writer) (1753–1839), British writer on horses who was an early advocate of animal rights
John Lawrence, 1st Baron Lawrence (1811–1879), Viceroy of India
John Lawrence, 2nd Baron Oaksey (1929–2012), British aristocrat, amateur jockey and horse racing commentator and journalist
John Craig Lawrence (born 1963), British Army officer
John Lawrence (political activist) (1915–2002), British socialist activist
John Lawrence (priest), English Anglican priest
John H. Lawrence (1904–1991), American physicist and pioneer in nuclear medicine
John Lawrence (cricketer) (born 1957), South African cricketer
John Shelton Lawrence, American professor of philosophy and non-fiction writer
Johnny Lawrence (cricketer) (1911–1988), English cricketer
John Geddes Lawrence, Jr., American medical technologist and co-plaintiff in United States Supreme Court case Lawrence v. Texas
Johnny Lawrence (character), fictional character from The Karate Kid franchise

See also
Jack Lawrence (disambiguation)